Douvas is a surname. Notable people with the surname include:

Elaine Douvas (born 1952), American classical oboist
Nikolaos Douvas (born 1947), Greek general